SCRM may refer to:
Scottish Centre for Regenerative Medicine
Supply chain risk management